The 2003-04 Top 16 season was the top level of French club rugby in 2003-05. The competition was played by 16 teams. In the first stage, two pools of 8 played. The first 4 of each pool were admitted to the "top 8" to play for the title, the other 4 to a relegation tournament.

First round 
(3 points for a win, 2 points for a draw, 1 point for a loss)

Pool A

Pool B

Relegation Pool
The teams total sum of the points obtained in the first round and the points obtained in the matches played with the 4 teams from the other group (home and away).

Top 8 
Two Pool of 4 teams. The first two of each pool were qualified for semifinals. Them and the third also qualified for 2004–05 Heineken Cup

Pool A

Pool B

Semifinals

Final

See also
 2003-04 Rugby Pro D2
 2003-04 Heineken Cup

External links
 LNR.fr

Top 14 seasons
   
France